Faride Alidou (born 18 July 2001) is a German professional footballer who plays as a winger for  club Eintracht Frankfurt. He has represented Germany at youth level.

Club career

Hamburger SV
Born in Hamburg, Alidou played youth football for  before joining Hamburger SV's academy in 2012. Having played for Hamburger SV II since 2019, he made his debut for the club's first team on 16 October 2021 in a 1–1 draw with Fortuna Düsseldorf. He scored his first goal in a 4–1 win over Jahn Regensburg on 20 November 2021.

Eintracht Frankfurt
On 23 March 2022, Alidou signed a pre-contract agreement with Bundesliga club Eintracht Frankfurt. He committed to a four-year contract at the club.

International career
Born in Germany, Alidou is of Togolese descent. He was called up to the Germany national under-20 team for the first time for fixtures against France and Portugal in November 2021. He appeared in both fixtures, scoring in the 3–2 win over France. He was called up to the Germany national under-21 team in March 2022 after multiple players withdrew due to injury.

Style of play
Alidou is right-footed, and played as a left winger in a front three at HSV. Hamburg's sporting director Michael Mutzel stated that Alidou "impresses through the freedom he plays with — he's also a strong dribbler and has good pace."

References

External links

2001 births
Living people
Footballers from Hamburg
German footballers
Germany youth international footballers
Germany under-21 international footballers
German people of Togolese descent
German sportspeople of African descent
Association football wingers
Hamburger SV players
Hamburger SV II players
Eintracht Frankfurt players
Bundesliga players
2. Bundesliga players
Regionalliga players
21st-century German people